Francesco Rospigliosi Pallavicini (2 March 1828 – 14 January 1887) was an Italian politician. He was born in Rome, in what was then the Papal States. He was the 1st mayor of Rome from 1871 to 1873. He served in the Senate of the Kingdom of Italy. He died in Rome, Italy.

References

1828 births
1887 deaths
19th-century Italian politicians
Mayors of Rome
Members of the Senate of the Kingdom of Italy